Brandshagen is a village and a former municipality in the Vorpommern-Rügen district, in Mecklenburg-Vorpommern, Germany. It is located on the Pomeranian mainland opposite the island of Rügen. 

It was named after Borante, an early member of the House of Putbus, who built a motte-and-bailey castle in the 13th century which has been proved by excavations. Hag(en) is an old word for an area enclosed or fenced in by a hedge  (like The Hague). 

Since 7 June 2009, it is part of the Sundhagen municipality.

Villages in Mecklenburg-Western Pomerania